David King (born 25 July 1990) is an Australian cricketer. He made two first-class appearances for Victoria in 2014. He was part of Australia's squad for the 2008 Under-19 Cricket World Cup.

References

External links
 

1990 births
Living people
Australian cricketers
Victoria cricketers
Place of birth missing (living people)